Otter Creek Township is a township in Jackson County, Iowa, USA.

History
Otter Creek Township was established in 1846.

References

Townships in Jackson County, Iowa
Townships in Iowa
1846 establishments in Iowa Territory